Pseudorhaphitoma pyramidalis is a small sea snail, a marine gastropod mollusk in the family Mangeliidae.

Description
The length of the shell attains 7 mm.

The white shell has a turreted pyramidal shape. The sculpture consists of longitudinal ribs, striated between the interstices. The aperture is small and short.

Distribution
This marine species occurs off the Philippines

References

External links
 
 

pyramidalis
Gastropods described in 1846